Pocona is a location in the Cochabamba Department in central Bolivia. It is the seat of the Pocona Municipality, the third municipal section of the Carrasco Province. At the time of census 2001 it had a population of 244.

Places of interest
 Inkallaqta

See also
 Carrasco National Park

References

External links
 Map: Carrasco Province

Populated places in Cochabamba Department